We'll Soon Find Out is an album by drummer Joey Baron which was recorded in 1999 and released on Schott Music's Intition label.

Reception

In his review for Allmusic, Tim Sheridan calls it " a nice mix of soulful jazz and progressive post-bop. An all around winning effort". On All About Jazz Glenn Astarita said "We’ll Soon Find Out offers breezy passages, finger snapping rhythms, strong yet unobtrusive and quite thoughtful soloing in accordance with Baron’s conspicuous compositional pen... Baron, Frisell, Blythe and Carter shine forth with a candid demeanor while also providing a clinic of sorts - on the art of making good music that certainly strikes a memorable chord". In JazzTimes Ron Wynn noted "Baron's Down Home Band eschews the rowdy approach in their playing; this date's about atmosphere much more than mood. Yet it's not so introspective the music gets boring. Rather, Joey Baron and the Down Home Band manage the tough task of going inside, while retaining their outside flair". PopMatters' James Mann said "Joey Baron seems to be both very active and blessed with good taste in sidemen. On this second release from these players (the first was Down Home in 1997), he has formed the basis for a hopefully long-lasting series of musical events. As long as the results are this satisfying, the jazz world will await future installments with eagerness".

Track listing
All compositions by Joey Baron
 "Slow Charleston" - 6:09
 "Closer Than You Think" - 7:50
 "Junior" - 5:53
 "Time to Cry" - 6:25
 "Wisely" - 5:44
 "Bit 'o Water" - 3:36
 "M" - 7:05
 "Equaled" - 4:22
 "Contact" - 7:05

Personnel
Joey Baron - drums
Arthur Blythe - alto saxophone
Bill Frisell - acoustic and electric guitar
Ron Carter - bass

References 

1999 albums
Joey Baron albums